The Congolese Plantation Workers Art League (or CATPC) makes chocolate sculptures. The group consists of workers recruited by Dutch artist Renzo Martens from a plantation owned by the consumer goods corporation Unilever. Martens was heretofore known for his provocations, including a documentary a decade earlier that suggested that the Congolese people capitalize their poverty as a natural resource. The CATPC artists—Djonga Bismar, Mathieu Kilapi Kasiama, Cedrick Tamasala, Mbuku Kimpala, Mananga Kibuila, Jérémie Mabiala, Emery Mohamba, and Thomas Leba—work with an ecologist and artists based in Kinshasa. Martens sells their works in his Berlin and Amsterdam galleries. As of late 2016, the worker–artists had received , or what Martens estimated as 15 additional annual salaries split among the group.

Martens has also sought to return the proceeds of the plantation workers' labor by asking major artists to donate artworks to a new plantation art museum as recompense for having received Unilever patronage through the Tate Modern. The artist Carsten Höller has donated. The white cube gallery opened in April 2017.

Their sculptures include portraits and allegories. Their material, the cocoa bean, carries political connotations, including concerns for its controversial labor conditions and effect on the environment.

References

Further reading 

 
 
 
 
 
 
 
 
 

Democratic Republic of the Congo artists
Unilever people
African sculpture
Chocolate culture